Pleurochrysis is the scientific name of two genera of organisms and may refer to:

Pleurochrysis (haptophyte)
Pleurochrysis (wasp)